Homoranthus thomasii is a species of flowering plant in the family Myrtaceae and is endemic to Queensland. It is a small shrub with spoon-shaped, greyish green leaves and small, pendulous, pink flowers in the upper leaf axils.

Description
This species is distinguished from most other species by its tall growth habit, axehead-shaped leaves and pendulous flowers. Flowers and fruits usually from April to August but may flower sporadically throughout the year.

Taxonomy and naming
This species was first formally described in 1864 by Ferdinand von Mueller who gave it the name Chamelaucium thomasii and published the description in the journal Fragmenta phytographiae Australiae. In 1991, Lyndley Craven and S.R.Jones changed the name to Homoranthus thomasii. The specific epithet (thomasii) honours the Melbourne doctor David John Thomas (1813–1871).

Distribution and habitat
Homoranthus thomasii grows in heath and woodland from Pentland to Mitchell. Grows on shallow, sandy soils derived from sandstone, mostly in woodland or heath.

Conservation
Although widely distributed, H. thomasii is of sporadic occurrence and was considered rare by Briggs and Leigh (1996). Given several recent discoveries of species in conservation areas. Now considered a ROTAP conservation 3RCa.

References

External links
 The Australasian Virtual Herbarium – Occurrence data for Homoranthus thomasii

thomasii
Flora of Queensland
Myrtales of Australia
Taxa named by Ferdinand von Mueller
Plants described in 1864